James III of Cyprus (or Jacques III de Lusignan) (6 July 1473 – 26 August 1474) was the only child by the marriage of James II of Cyprus and Catherine Cornaro. He died in mysterious circumstances as an infant, leaving his mother as the last Queen of Cyprus. His death paved the way for Venice to gain control of Cyprus.

Kings of Cyprus
15th-century monarchs in Europe
1473 births
1474 deaths
15th-century Cypriot people
Claimant Kings of Jerusalem
Monarchs who died as children
Medieval child monarchs
Cypriot children
People from Famagusta
Burials at Saint Nicholas Cathedral, Famagusta
House of Poitiers-Lusignan